A shoulder sleeve insignia (SSI) is an embroidered emblem worn on the sleeves of some United States Army uniforms to identify the primary headquarters to which a soldier is assigned. Like division sized units, separate brigades of the U.S. Army are allowed their own SSI to distinguish their wearers from those of other units. Most military units smaller than brigades do not have SSI, but rather wear the SSI of a higher headquarters.  The following list of SSIs represent some of the current and former brigades of the U.S. Army:

Air defense artillery Brigades

Armored Brigades

Aviation Brigades

Battlefield surveillance Brigades

Cavalry Brigades

Chemical Brigades

Civil affairs Brigades

Engineer Brigades

Field artillery/fires Brigades

Infantry Brigades

Maneuver enhancement Brigades

Medical Brigades

Military intelligence Brigades

Military police Brigades

Space and missile defense Brigades

Signal Brigades

Support Brigades

Sustainment Brigades

Transportation Brigades

See also
 commons:Field Army insignia of the United States Army
 Corps Insignia of the United States Army
 Division insignia of the United States Army
 Miscellaneous shoulder sleeve insignia of the United States Army
 Miscellaneous United States Army coats of arms

References 

 The US Army Institute of Heraldry
 GlobalSecurity.org

Brigades of the United States Army
Heraldry of the United States Army